The Old Wives' Tale is a novel by Arnold Bennett, first published in 1908.  It deals with the lives of two very different sisters, Constance and Sophia Baines, following their stories from their youth, working in their mother's draper's shop, into old age.  It covers a period of about 70 years from roughly 1840 to 1905, and is set in Burslem and Paris.  It is generally regarded as one of Bennett's finest works. 

Bennett was initially inspired to write the book by a chance encounter in a Parisian restaurant. In the introduction to the book, he says

and

Bennett also found inspiration in Maupassant's novel Une Vie.

Plot details 
The book is broken up into four parts. The first section, "Mrs Baines" details the adolescence of both Sophia and Constance, and their life in their father's shop and house (a combined property). The father is ill and bedridden, and the main adult in their life is Mrs Baines, their mother.

By the end of the first book, Sophia (whose name reflects her sophistication, as opposed to the constant Constance) has eloped with a travelling salesman. Constance meanwhile marries Mr Povey, who works in the shop.

The second part, "Constance", details the life of Constance from that point forward up until the time she is reunited with her sister in old age. Her life, although outwardly prosaic, is nevertheless filled with personal incident, including the death of her husband, Mr Povey, and her concerns about the character and behaviour of her son.

The third part, "Sophia", carries forward the story of what happened to Sophia after her elopement. Abandoned by her husband in Paris, Sophia eventually becomes the owner of a successful pension.

The final part, "What Life Is", details how the two sisters are eventually reunited. Sophia returns to England and the house of her childhood, where Constance still lives.

Details and legacy
According to Tom Wolfe (Hooking Up, p. 148), the book was "wildly successful," with the author demurring with "I don't read my reviews, I measure them."

In 1998, the Modern Library ranked The Old Wives' Tale No. 87 on its list of the 100 best English-language novels of the 20th century.

A facsimile edition of the manuscript has been published, which is a testament to Bennett's calligraphic skills.  The original manuscript is in the Lilly Library, Indiana.

It was adapted into a 1921 film The Old Wives' Tale starring Fay Compton. It was made into a TV series by the BBC in 1988 as Sophia and Constance.

References

External links

 
 
 

1908 British novels
Novels by Arnold Bennett
Novels set in Staffordshire
Novels set in Paris
Chapman & Hall books
British novels adapted into television shows
British novels adapted into films